South Staffordshire Water plc known as South Staffs Water is a UK water supply company owned by a privately owned utilities company serving parts of Staffordshire the West Midlands as well as small areas of surrounding counties in England. South Staffordshire Water plc is part of South Staffordshire plc. It purchased Cambridge Water in 2011. In 2013, KKR & Co. L.P., a company registered in the United States of America, acquired South Staffordshire Water from Alinda Infrastructure Fund. As of April 2018, KKR & Co. has agreed to sell its 75% equity stake in South Staffordshire Water to Arjun Infrastructure Partners (AIP).

Company

South Staffordshire Water provides drinking water to 1.6 million consumers and supplies 330 million litres of water every day across a network of pipes that total  in length to approximately 500,000 homes and 36,000 business customers in an area covering .  Under Ofwat's measure of overall service to customers, OPA, the company has been positioned in the top five of the generally 20–23 water companies in every year since 1999.

As South Staffordshire Water is a water-only company Severn Trent Water provides all mains sewerage services to customers in South Staffordshire's designated area.

Supply area

The South Staffordshire Water supply area covers areas to the north and west of Birmingham. The majority of the supply area is within the counties of Staffordshire and the West Midlands but the company also supplies water to parts of Derbyshire, Leicestershire, Warwickshire and Worcestershire.

 Uttoxeter
 Burton upon Trent
 Rugeley
 Cannock
 Lichfield
 Brownhills
 Burntwood
 Tamworth
 Aldridge
 Walsall
 Sutton Coldfield
 West Bromwich
 Kinver
 Tipton
 Dudley
 Rowley Regis
 Willington
 Etwall

Performance
South Staffordshire Water was joint first with Anglian Water in Ofwat’s Service Incentive Mechanism ‘Satisfaction by Company’ survey 2012/13.

The company were 99.91% compliant with drinking water quality tests carried out in 2012/13.

Leakage performance was at 65.3 megalitres per day in 2012/13, compared to 68.2 Ml/d in 2011/12 and 72.8 Ml/d in 2010/11.

The annual operational greenhouse gas emissions of the regulated business were 55.41 kilotonnes in 2012/13, compared to 61.61 ktC02e in 2011/12.

Water sources

Two of South Staffordshire Water's reservoirs supply 60% of water demand with the remainder provided by 69 boreholes.

Reservoirs
 Barr Beacon Reservoir, Barr Beacon, Walsall, 
 Blithfield Reservoir, Abbots Bromley, Staffordshire 
 Chelmarsh Reservoir, Chelmarsh, Shropshire

History

 1853 South Staffordshire Waterworks Company is formed
 1858 Opening of the works in Walsall. Wednesbury is the first area supplied
 1860 Tipton and West Bromwich receive water supplies 
 1862 SSWC take over Dudley Waterworks. Netherton and Oldbury receive water supplies
 1864 SSWC take over Burton Waterworks
 1875 Cannock area supplied
 1929 SSWC take over Kinver Waterworks.
 1953 Blithfield Reservoir, Abbots Bromley near Rugeley, is opened by Queen Elizabeth The Queen Mother
 1962 SSWC take over Tamworth Water Works
 1991 South Staffordshire Waterworks Company became a public limited company in 1991 and was listed on the London Stock Exchange as South Staffordshire Water.
 1992 South Staffordshire Water Holdings (eventually South Staffordshire Group Plc) was created to grow non-regulated businesses.
 1996 Blithfield Education Centre is opened by Bill Oddie
 2004 South Staffordshire Group Plc (which became Homeserve Plc) de-merged South Staffordshire Plc, which included South Staffordshire Water, Echo, Rapid, Underground Pipeline Services and Aqua Direct, as a separate listed company on the London Stock Exchange.
 2004 Acquired by Arcapita Bank, a Bahrain-based company, at a price of £11.20 per share (£237m including debt) and delisted from the Stock Exchange.
 2007 Acquired by Alinda Infrastructure Fund, a European and American investor in infrastructure assets.
 2013 Acquired by KKR & Co. L.P. (formerly known as Kohlberg Kravis Roberts & Co.), an American multinational private equity firm, specializing in leveraged buyouts, headquartered in New York.
 2018 Acquired by Arjun Infrastructure Partners (AIP)

References

External links

Water companies of England
Staffordshire
West Midlands (county)
British companies established in 1853
Renewable resource companies established in the 1850s